{
  "type": "ExternalData",
  "service": "geoline",
  "ids": "Q474391",
  "properties": {
    "stroke": "#721422",
    "stroke-width": 6
  }
}

The LRT Ampang Line and the LRT Sri Petaling Line are medium-capacity light rapid transit (LRT) lines in the Klang Valley, Malaysia. The combined network comprises 45.1 kilometres of tracks (28.0 miles) with 36 stations and was the first railway in Malaysia to use standard-gauge track and semi-automated trains. It is operated as part of the RapidKL system by Rapid Rail, a subsidiary of Prasarana Malaysia.

A trip from one end to the other takes 41 minutes on the Ampang Line, and 74 minutes on the Sri Petaling Line.

The Ampang Line is named after its eastern terminus, Ampang station, while the Sri Petaling Line is named after its former southern terminus, Sri Petaling station.

The Ampang and Sri Petaling Lines form part of the Klang Valley Integrated Transit System, numbered 3 and 4, and are coloured orange and maroon on official rail maps respectively.

History

The Ampang Line and Sri Petaling Line were originally known as the STAR LRT (abbreviation for Sistem Transit Aliran Ringan, which translates to Light Rail Transit System), a single train line originating at Sentul Timur station, with two branches to Ampang and Sri Petaling via Chan Sow Lin station.

STAR LRT was first conceived in the 1981 Transport Master Plan, when the Malaysian government proposed a network of LRT lines connecting Kuala Lumpur city centre with the surrounding areas. An agreement was signed between the government and STAR in 1992.

The original system (27.4 km) consists of 25 stations built in two phases. Phase one (12.4 km) consists of 14 stations (Ampang – Sultan Ismail) and a depot near Ampang station. Phase two (15 km) consists of 11 stations (Chan Sow Lin – Sri Petaling, and Sultan Ismail – Sentul Timur). The two phases opened in December 1996 and July 1998 respectively.

The initial plan was for STAR to build, own and manage the STAR LRT. However, STAR ran into financial difficulties and had to be bailed out by the government. So, in 2002, Prasarana took over the line and renamed the STAR LRT to the STAR Line. Operations of the line were subsequently transferred to Rapid KL in 2004 and the line was renamed the Ampang Line and Sri Petaling Line in 2005. The Ampang Line assumed the branch line between Sentul Timur and Ampang stations, whereas Sri Petaling Line assumed the branch line between Sentul Timur and Sri Petaling stations.

In 2006, the government announced the Sri Petaling Line extension project. The extension comprises 11 new stations over 17.7 kilometres of elevated track beyond Sri Petaling station. This extended the terminus of the Sri Petaling Line from Sri Petaling to Putra Heights. Unlike the original line, which uses the Fixed-block signalling system, the extension uses the Communications-based train control (CBTC) signalling system. As a result, when the first four stations and the next four stations opened on 31 October 2015 and 31 March 2016, the extension ran as a separate train service between Sri Petaling station and Bandar Puteri station.
Re-signalling had to be carried out on the original line before the extension could be combined with the rest of the line. Thales was awarded a contract on 3 September 2012 to upgrade the signalling system on the original line, and the work was completed in July 2016.

Stations 
The Ampang and Sri Petaling Lines run on a common route between Sentul Timur station and Chan Sow Lin station, serving central Kuala Lumpur and the city centre, effectively making all the stations on this section act as interchanges between both lines. The stations have a dedicated platform for trains travelling north to Sentul Timur, and one for trains travelling to Chan Sow Lin, with trains on the respective lines taking turns to stop at the stations at a given time. From the Chan Sow Lin station, the lines diverge and run separately. The Ampang Line travels to its terminus, Ampang station, serving towns in the Cheras and Ampang Jaya regions. The Sri Petaling Line runs to Putra Heights station, where it meets the Kelana Jaya Line, serving southern Kuala Lumpur and Puchong. 

Stations on both the lines have similar architectural designs and are a mixture of surface and elevated stops. There are no underground stations on both lines. Most of the stations utilise two side platforms, except for 4 stations that use one single island platform. Chan Sow Lin station has 2 island platforms, allowing cross-platform transfers between trains from Ampang and Putra Heights, while the Putra Heights station has 2 side platforms and 1 island platform to facilitate transfers between the Sri Petaling Line and Kelana Jaya Line.

The stations were initially built without accessibility options for disabled passengers. At the beginning of 2012, disabled-friendly facilities for most stations on both lines were installed.

LRT Ampang Line

LRT Sri Petaling Line

Rolling stock 
The Ampang and Sri Petaling Lines system network fleet consists of the following models:

 50 6-car CSR Zhuzhou articulated LRV trainsets, nicknamed as AMY, operated since January 2015.
 29 + 1 (out of service) 6-car Adtranz-Walkers LRV trainsets, which were operated from December 1996 until December 2016, have been phased out and replaced by CSR Zhuzhou articulated LRV trainsets.

1st generation Adtranz-Walkers EMU 

The former fleet consisted of 90 Adtranz standard-gauge light rail vehicle (LRV) manufactured by Walkers Limited of Australia. These trains were electric multiple units (EMU), which draw power from the underside of a third rail alongside the track. All cars in each train were powered. The trains were manned, with driver cabs occupying the ends of the train. The four-car trainset, an initial configuration that consists of only two EMU sets (2+2) of one driving car and one trailer car at both ends were used from the beginning of the operation in 1996. This formation were used in service until the centre trailer cars were added, becoming the six-car trainset, which consisted of three sets of two EMUs (2+2+2) and occupied the maximum platform length of the stations. Each of the two EMU sets at the front and rear consisted of one driving car and one trailer car, while the two EMUs between were trailer cars. Each two EMU sets were not connected to other EMU sets in the train.

Each car had 3 bogies: 2 power bogies and one articulated trailer for the centre bogie. The end cars, numbered 1101 to 1260, have driver cabs. Middle cars numbered 2201 to 2230 have a concealed driver control panel, enabling the car to be moved around the depot independently.

The train interiors were simple and basic. There were no individual seats, only longitudinal bench seating on either side of the train, surfaced in metal, while spaces near the connecting ends of the cars were provided for passengers who use wheelchairs and other assistive devices, with a large amount of floorspace for standing passengers. The rolling stock, which has remained relatively unchanged since its introduction in 1996, were replaced in stages by the new trains between 2015 and 2016.

2nd generation CSR-Zhuzhou LRV 

The second generation rolling stock of the Ampang Line and Sri Petaling Line currently consists of a fleet of 50 new trains, better known as AMY, that are deployed to increase the capacity of the line and provide a better service. Each of the new trains is six cars long and provided by CSR Zhuzhou of China, similar to on the design for İzmir Metro and Buenos Aires Underground 200 Series. These trains are disabled-friendly and include safety features like closed-circuit TV, emergency breakable window, emergency ventilation fan, fire and smoke detection system. The trains are equipped with supervised automatic train operation system (SATO), which claims to be the first railway in Malaysia to introduce such systems. Other elements such as interactive destination display inside the train, non-slipping seats, LCD infotainment, walk-through gangways, and more wheelchair space were included. The first trains were put into service on the Sri Petaling-Kinrara BK5 stretch in October 2015, and then until Putra Heights and Sentul Timur in July 2016, and finally the Ampang branch line in December 2016.

Formation
Each train consists of six cars, with numbers 1 to 6 labelled sequentially.

Train control 
The Ampang and Sri Petaling Lines are equipped with the Thales SelTrac Communications-based train control (CBTC) signaling system, and the iVENCS Control Systems.

The operations are controlled at the Ampang Operational and Control Centre, with two depots located at Ampang on the Ampang Line and Kampung Kuala Sungai Baru on the Sri Petaling Line.

Ridership

Accidents and incidents 
There were two major incidents since the opening in 1996.

Sentul Timur buffer overshoot 
On  at 7:11am, a six-coach Adtranz LRT train which came in from Ampang overshot the end of the elevated tracks at the end of the stabling tracks at Sentul Timur station, resulting in the front half of the set 1113 dangling in the air about 25 m above the ground. A lone driver was the only one on board when the incident took place. Only Sentul Timur endured service disruption for 20 minutes that day.

Bukit Jalil train collision 
On  at 6:30pm, two LRT trains collided about 200m from Bukit Jalil station. A carriage of one of the trains involved in the accident hit the rear of the other train, resulting the suspension of the operation on that day. Six passengers were injured in this accident.

Kinked tracks between Bandaraya and Masjid Jamek stations 
On , a kinked track as well as cracked viaduct and pier was found near Bandaraya LRT station, and the route between Bandaraya and Masjid Jamek LRT station is closed temporarily for safety reasons. Free shuttle busses are provided between Bandaraya, Masjid Jamek and Hang Tuah LRT stations. Investigations found out that it was caused by the construction of a 44-storey hotel nearby. It is expected to take up to seven months to repair.
Revised service are as follows:
Trains from Ampang and Putra Heights will terminate at Hang Tuah.
Shuttle train between Hang Tuah and Masjid Jamek.
Trains from Sentul Timur will terminate at Bandaraya, with 24 minute frequency.
Replacement bus between Hang Tuah and Bandaraya, stopping at every stations (LRT9)
Replacement bus between Masjid Jamek and Bandaraya, stopping at every stations (LRT10)
Replacement bus between Sentul Timur and Bandaraya, stopping at every stations (LRT11)

References

External links

 Land Public Transport Commission
 Prasarana Malaysia Berhad
 RapidKL
 Klang Valley Mass Rapid Transit (KVMRT) Project
 KL Mass Rapid Transit (KLMRT) Line Integrations

Route maps
 The official Greater KL / Klang Valley Integrated Transit Map

1996 establishments in Malaysia
 
Railway lines opened in 1996